Mach 6 or variation, may refer to:

 Mach number representing 6-times the speed of sound
 Hypersonic speed of 6-times the speed of sound
 Mach 6 (album), 2003 album by MC Solaar
 Mach Six, racing car in the Speed Racer franchise
 Mach-VI, alias of the Marvel Comics character Abner Jenkins

See also

 
 
 
 Mach (disambiguation)